Thomas J. Hageboeck (July 20, 1945 – April 4, 1996) was an American film and television actor, best known for playing characters involved in law enforcement.

Life and career
Hageboeck was born in Baltimore, Maryland. He attended Chesapeake High School and after the University of Maryland. In 1966, Hageboeck served in the United States Marine Corps during the Vietnam War era.

In 1984, Hageboeck made his first film appearance, in the Oscar-nominated film Beverly Hills Cop, as a Maitland bodyguard. Four years later, he appeared as Sergeant Gooch in the action comedy film, Midnight Run, which starred Robert De Niro. In 1989, Hageboeck made his first television appearance in Alien Nation in the episode "Fifteen with Wanda" as the Officer. In 1990, he appeared in the film Vietnam, Texas as the policeman. From 1990 to 1996, Hageboeck appeared in numerous films such as Jennifer Eight in 1992, Double Jeopardy also in 1992, Come Die with Me: A Mickey Spillane's Mike Hammer Mystery in 1994, Serial Killer in 1995, and last but not least in The Rock. Hageboeck died two months prior to The Rock's film release. He died on April 4, 1996, at age 50 in San Francisco, California.

Filmography

External links

1945 births
1996 deaths
American male film actors
American male television actors
Male actors from Baltimore
University of Maryland, College Park alumni
20th-century American male actors
United States Marines